Neonoemacheilus is a genus of Asian stone loaches.

Species
There are currently five recognized species in this genus:
 Neonoemacheilus assamensis (Menon, 1987)
 Neonoemacheilus labeosus (Kottelat, 1982)
 Neonoemacheilus mengdingensis S. Q. Zhu & Q. Z. Guo, 1989
 Neonoemacheilus morehensis Arunkumar, 2000
 Neonoemacheilus peguensis (Hora, 1929)

References

Nemacheilidae
Fish of Asia